The 2006 Coupe Internationale de Nice was the 11th edition of an annual international figure skating competition held in Nice, France. It was held between November 9 and 12, 2006. Skaters competed in the disciplines of men's singles, ladies' singles, and pair skating on the levels of senior, junior, and novice.

Senior results

Men

Ladies

Pairs

Junior results

Men

Ladies

Novice results

Boys

Girls

External links
 11ème Coupe Internationale De La Ville De Nice

Coupe Internationale de Nice
Coupe Internationale De Nice, 2006